Ustrzyki may refer to the following places in Poland:

Ustrzyki Dolne
Ustrzyki Górne